Guardians of the Clouds is a 2004 Italian drama film written and directed  by Luciano Odorisio and starring Alessandro Gassmann, Franco Nero and Anna Galiena. It won the Golden Pyramid at the 28th Cairo International Film Festival.

Plot

Cast 
Alessandro Gassmann as Batino
Franco Nero as The Father
Anna Galiena as  Donna Maddalena
Claudia Gerini as  Nannina
Leo Gullotta as La Rocca
 Sergio Sivori as Costantino
Sergio Assisi as  Crescenzo
Luisa Ranieri

See also 
 List of Italian films of 2004

References

External links 

2004 drama films
2004 films
Italian drama films
Films directed by Luciano Odorisio
Films scored by Ennio Morricone
2000s Italian films